Betutu is a Balinese dish of steamed or roasted chicken or duck in rich bumbu betutu (betutu spice mix). This highly seasoned and spiced dish is a popular dish in Bali and Lombok, Indonesia. An even spicier version is available using extra-spicy sauce made from uncooked (raw) onion slices mixed with red chili peppers and coconut oil.

Betutu is a richly spiced Balinese poultry dish. It is often called according to its main ingredients; ayam betutu is chicken betutu, while bebek betutu is the duck version. This traditional dish can be found on the menu of luxury hotels or restaurants in Bali, and it is popular among tourists.

Spice mixture

The term betutu is the Balinese word for a certain spice mixture (bumbu) which consist of shallots, garlic, turmeric, ginger, wild ginger, galangal, candle nuts, chili peppers, shrimp paste, and peanuts all finely ground using mortar and pestle. The betutu spice paste is sauteed with coconut oil to release its aroma, and applied to poultry, chicken or duck. Common side dishes may include plecing kangkung, crispy-fried peanuts and sambal terasi.

Regional differences
In Bali, betutu's tastes and ways of cooking are different according to regions: in Klungkung, chicken is stuffed with betutu spices; in Gianyar betutu is cooked with a plantain leaf wrapping; and in Gilimanuk, betutu is hot and spicy.

Further reading
 Ayam Betutu Gilimanuk, “Nak Seken Nee…” KOMPAS, January 21, 2007, Sunday. Retrieved on May 2, 2007.

See also

 Cuisine of Indonesia
 Kapampangan cuisine (Philippine) which has Betute and Nasing biringyi.
 List of duck dishes

References

Balinese cuisine